The Northern Highland is a geographical region in the north central United States covering much of the northern territory of the state of Wisconsin.

The region stretches from the state border with Minnesota in the west to the Michigan border in the east, and from Douglas and Bayfield Counties in the north to Wood and Portage Counties in the south. While most of northern Wisconsin is within the Northern Highland region, a short belt of land along the coast of Lake Superior is not included in the area, and is instead part of the Lake Superior Lowland region. Outside Wisconsin the highland stretches northward in Canada through the Upper Peninsula of Michigan and the Canadian Shield in Northern Ontario and Quebec to Labrador and Hudson Bay.

Geography

The Northern Highland was once a mountain range similar to the Alps or Rocky Mountains of today. Over hundreds of millions of years, these mountains  were worn and flattened out by erosion and glaciation. The region is mostly a smooth plain, but it remains higher than the rest of the state and some hilly regions continue to exist. Located near the center of the region, Timms Hill in Price County is the highest point in Wisconsin, at an elevation of  feet above sea level. Other hills such as Rib Mountain also approach this elevation.

Whether hilly or flat, most of the Northern Highland is covered in woodlands. The most common trees of the Northern Highland are the Sugar Maple, Aspen, Basswood, Hemlock, and Yellow Birch, as well as Red and White Pine. A large amount of the forestland in the region is included within the  Chequamegon-Nicolet National Forest. State and county forests also cover a significant part of the region, and only a small portion of the land is devoted to agriculture. 

The largest city in the region is Wausau, with a population of 38,426. Other principal cities include Merrill, Rhinelander, and Ladysmith. Despite the absence of large cities, tourism is an important part of the local economy. The region’s numerous lakes and forests make it a popular destination for outdoor enthusiasts during the summer season.

This is part of a northern Wisconsin area colloquially referred to as "up north."

Northern Highland Lake District
The Northern Highland Lake District consists of Lake Peter, Paul, and Tuesday. These lakes appeared during an ice age around 12,000 years ago.

Wildlife
The wildlife of the Northern Highlands includes whitetail deer, timber wolves, elk, moose, and bear.  With a growing population of the timber wolf, Wisconsin officials have agreed to allow a lottery system for the hunting of these wolves.

Counties in the Northern Highland
Part or all of the land in the following counties is included in the Northern Highland of Wisconsin:

Ashland County
Bayfield County
Burnett County
Chippewa County
Douglas County
Florence County
Forest County
Iron County

Langlade County
Lincoln County
Marathon County
Marinette County
Menominee County
Oconto County
Oneida County
Portage County

Price County
Rusk County
Sawyer County
Shawano County
Taylor County
Vilas County
Washburn County
Wood County

References

Regions of Wisconsin
Geology of Wisconsin